The 2014 Tour of Slovenia (Slovene: Dirka po Sloveniji 2014) was the 21st edition of the Tour of Slovenia, a part of the UCI Europe Tour. It started in Ljubljana, Slovenia, on 19 June 2014 and ended in Novo Mesto, Slovenia, on 22 June 2014.

Race overview

Teams
18 teams contested the race.

Slovenia (national team)

Stages

Stage 1
19 June 2014 — Ljubljana, individual time trial (ITT)

Stage 2
20 June 2014 — Ribnica to Kočevje,

Stage 3
21 June 2014 — Rogaška Slatina to Trije kralji,

Stage 4 
22 June 2014 — Škofja Loka to Novo Mesto,

Classification leadership

Classification standings

General classification

Points classification

Mountains classification

Young Riders classification

Team classification

References

External links
 Official final results  Bulletin No. 5, Tour of Slovenia 2014

Tour of Slovenia
Tour of Slovenia
Tour of Slovenia